Mariela Griffor (born September 29, 1961, in Concepcion, Chile), is a poet, editor, publisher of Marick Press and diplomat. She is author of four poetry collections, Exiliana, House, The Psychiatrist and most recently, Declassified (Eyewear Publishing, 2016), and has had her poems and translations published in many literary journals and magazines including Poetry International, Washington Square Review, Texas Poetry Review, and Éditions d'art Le Sabord, in anthologies including Poetry in Michigan / Michigan in Poetry, from New Issues Press. A variety of Griffor's poems has been translated into Italian, French, Chinese, Swedish, and Spanish. She has been nominated to the Griffin Poetry Prize, to the Whiting Awards and the PEN/Beyond Margins Award. She was finalist and shortlisted for the 2017 National Translation Award for Canto General by Pablo Neruda.

Early life
Griffor was born in Concepcion, Chile. She attended the University of Santiago and the Catholic University of Rio de Janeiro. She left Chile for an involuntary exile in Sweden in 1985. Griffor holds a B.A in Journalism from Wayne State University and a M.F.A in creative writing from New England College. She and her American husband returned to the United States in 1998. They live in Grosse Pointe Park, Michigan.

Career

Griffor is co-founder of the institute for Creative Writers at Wayne State University and Publisher of Marick Press. Her work has appeared in Passages North, Cerise Press, Washington Square Review, Texas Poetry Review and many others. She is the author of Exiliana (Luna Publications) and House (Mayapple Press). Her latest publication are The Psychiatrist (Eyewear Publishing 2013 and Declassified, 2017). She is honorary consul of Chile in Michigan.

Griffor writes about her homeland of Chile, and her immigrant experiences as an exile in both Sweden and the United States.

Works
Griffor, who is bilingual, is a rare exception among lyrical Chilean writers that publishes here [Chile] and in other places. In Resolana one notices an exceptional consistency, a coherence in contrast to the robust naturalism of our tradition and, above all, a profound cultural formation – without a doubt, immersed in the North American lyric, especially Emily Dickinson, Wallace Stevens, Elizabeth Bishop, Marianne Moore – consolidated in hymns to the common and current, in the everyday, in the allusion to the flora and fauna that, without extending in manifest form, uses symbols and literary resources so that the verbal weight asserts itself to her readers.
If one has to position Griffor within the recent history of Chilean poetry, her art is closest to poets such as Jorge Teillier, Delia Domínguez and the early Enrique Lihn.

Poetry
Exiliana, [Luna Publications]  (Toronto, CANADA), 2007
House, [Mayapple Press]  (Bay City, Michigan, USA), 2007
The Psychiatrist, [Eyewear Publishing]  (London, UK), 2013
Resolana, El Taller del Poeta  (Madrid, SPAIN), 2013
Declassified, [Eyewear Publishing]  (London, UK), 2017

TranslationCanto General, Tupelo Press, Canto General  (Boston, USA), 2016Bailando en Odesa, Tupelo Press, Bailando en Odesa  (Boston, USA), 2017

EditingPoetry International'', Issue 13/14 2009 Special Double Issue Featuring Chilean Poetry Today [San Diego State University Press]   (San Diego, California), 2009

References

External links
 
 Marick Press
 
 The Psychiatrist" by Mariela Griffor
 Death in Argentina" by Mariela Griffor

1961 births
Living people
American women poets
Chilean emigrants to the United States
Chilean exiles
Chilean women journalists
Chilean women writers
Chilean women poets
Hispanic and Latino American journalists
Hispanic and Latino American poets
New England College alumni
University of Santiago, Chile alumni
Wayne State University alumni
Wayne State University people
Writers from Michigan
21st-century Chilean poets
21st-century American women writers
American women non-fiction writers
21st-century American non-fiction writers
21st-century American poets